Roxanne Hart (born July 27, 1952) is an American actress, best known for her roles as Brenda Wyatt in the 1986 film Highlander, and as Nurse Camille Shutt on the CBS medical drama series Chicago Hope (1994–1998). Hart has also received Tony and Drama Desk Awards nominations for her stage work.

Personal life
Hart was born in Trenton, New Jersey, the daughter of Joan Irene (née McKee) and Edward J. Hart, Jr. Her father was a teacher and later became the principal at Horace Greeley High School in Chappaqua, New York. She graduated from Greeley in 1969. She was married to Leonard Taylor from 1972 until their divorce in 1980. Hart has been married to actor Philip Casnoff since 1984, and they have two sons, Alexander Casnoff (b. 1988) and Macklin McKee Casnoff (b. 1992).

Career
Hart appeared in several Broadway stage productions during 1980s, including the U.S. production of British playwright Peter Nichols' Passion, for which she received a Tony Award for Best Featured Actress in a Play nomination in 1983. She played supporting roles in films including The Verdict (1982) and Oh, God! You Devil (1984), before landing a role opposite Christopher Lambert in Highlander in 1986. She has also played starring and supporting roles in Pulse (1988), Once Around (1991) and Moonlight Mile (2002). Hart also starred in a number of made for television movies.

From 1994 to 1998, Hart played Nurse Camille Shutt in the CBS medical drama series Chicago Hope. She had recurring roles on the 1990s HBO sitcom Dream On and NBC's Medium (2006–2010), and the HBO comedy Hung (2010–2011). She also guest starred on ER, Law & Order, Criminal Minds, Oz, Grey's Anatomy, The Closer, and CSI: Crime Scene Investigation. In 2016, Hart was cast in a recurring role on the second season of the ABC legal drama How to Get Away with Murder.

Filmography

Film

Television

References

External links

1952 births
Actresses from New Jersey
American film actresses
American stage actresses
American television actresses
Living people
Actors from Trenton, New Jersey
People from Chappaqua, New York
20th-century American actresses
21st-century American actresses
Horace Greeley High School alumni